The Dassault Étendard VI was a French prototype fighter aircraft initially developed as part of the NATO NBMR-1 competition to find a standard fighter to serve amongst member air forces. Dassault took advantage of the fact that the French Air Force had issued a requirement around the same time for a new fighter-bomber and developed aircraft in parallel as variations of the same design concept for the two prospective customers.

Originally designated Mystère XXVI, the aircraft was accepted as one of the entrants to be developed to prototype stage for a fly-off with competing designs. It fared well in test flights, but was out-performed by the Aeritalia G.91 that was eventually selected as the winner of the competition.

A further development of the Étendard concept, the Étendard IV was successfully developed for French Navy service.

Specifications

See also

References

Single-engined jet aircraft
Etendard VI
1950s French fighter aircraft